Alan Robert (born 1971) is an American musician and comic book creator, known as the bassist for the alternative metal band Life of Agony, his work on his graphic novels Wire Hangers, Crawl to Me and Killogy, as well as his horror-themed adult coloring book series The Beauty of Horror.

Career 
Robert graduated with a Bachelor of Fine Arts from New York's School of Visual Arts, where he studied cartooning under teacher Walter Simonson.

Music 
Robert is credited as being one of the original members of the Brooklyn, NY-based band, Life of Agony, in 1989, and is the band's primary songwriter.

In 2006, Robert announced the creation of a punk rock band Spoiler NYC, which he formed with long-time friend, "Junkyard" Silletti and Tommy Clayton. The band released the full-length record Greasefire in Hell's Kitchen in 2008 and toured Europe with Life of Agony. Best known for their high-energy live shows which regularly feature dedications to their merchandise coordinator, Guy Bannister, Spoiler NYC released two songs in 2009.

In 2016, Robert and the other original members of Life of Agony announced they would be releasing their first new album in over eleven years, "A Place Where There's No More Pain" on Napalm Records.  The album (the fifth release by Life of Agony) was released worldwide on April 28, 2017. The album debuted at No. 24 on Billboard's Hard Rock Albums chart, and received critical acclaim from Rolling Stone, Kerrang, Revolver, and several other high-profile music reviewers.  Alan, along with the rest of the band, announced several concerts in the United States and Europe to support the album.

Robert's band announced the release, in October 2019, of its sixth studio album The Sound of Scars on Napalm Records, which acts as "Chapter Two" to their classic debut River Runs Red. The concept album, hailed by Loudwire as one of the year's "Most Anticipated Hard Rock & Metal Albums", was produced & mixed by Grammy Award-winning producer Sylvia Massy and co-produced by Joey Z. Howie Weinberg handled mastering duties.

On August 9, 2019, the hit single "Scars" premiered on Billboard the song went to the number 1 spot on Music Choice with 2.44 million listeners.

Comics work 
Robert is currently active in the comic book industry, having first created a four-part horror/conspiracy miniseries, Wire Hangers, which he also wrote and illustrated. The series was published in 2010 by IDW Publishing.

The first issue of the comic series won ComicMonsters.com's 2010 Best Cover Award.

On March 29, 2011, Alan Robert announced a live action feature film version of the Wire Hangers graphic novel, which to be produced by Robert's production company, Wasted Talent Entertainment" in connection with Zam Entertainment.

Robert announced the four-issue miniseries, Crawl To Me, which was published by IDW Publishing, whose story follows a young family who are confronted with a series of disturbing events in their rural home. The first issue was released in July 2011.

The series won the Mini-Series of the Year from ComicMonsters.com and TheSickHouse.net's 2011 Golden Gore Award for Best Graphic Novel.

The first printing of Crawl To Me sold out within a week of its publication and a second printing was quickly announced. A hardcover version, titled Crawl to Me: Evil Edgar Edition was later released in various formats. At the same time, Robert announced that a full-length movie based on the graphic novel was in the works. Screenwriters T.J. Cimfel and David White signed on shortly afterwards to adapt a screenplay based on the property. In December 2012, IDW Limited released two limited-run hardcover versions of the comic series in a black and red label options, featuring original artwork by Alan Robert included within each package.

On December 29, 2011, Robert appeared on second series premiere of the TLC television show, NY Ink, in the episode "Kings of NY", in which he received a tattoo based on the cover art from the first issue of Crawl To Me.

In "Wolf and Cub", the February 9, 2012, episode of the CBS show Person of Interest, several IDW Publishing books and posters are featured on the set, including Alan's Crawl to Me, Wire Hangers and Killogy. A Crawl to Me poster painted by artist Menton3 was featured in a pivotal scene inside a comic book shop near the end of the episode. The graphic novel will be adapted in a full-length film produced by Robert and screenplay will re-written by David White and T.J. Cimfel.

On May 10, 2012, Robert announced he was teaming with IDW Publishing again for his next comic series, Killogy, a four-issue series depicting the stories of three murderers who share a prison cell who are depicted with the likenesses of Frank Vincent, Marky Ramone and Brea Grant. The first issue was released in October 2012.

Upon its Halloween 2012 release, Killogy became a hit series and received rave reviews from respected horror and comic book critics. Fangoria hailed it, saying, "Killogy is an INSTANT CLASSIC... it finds its way into your head and stays there!" while Giant Fire Breathing Robot praised "With Killogy, Alan Robert has not only earned his place amongst the big names in comics, but he can stand shoulder to shoulder with some of the best horror creators in any form.

Killogy won a Horror Comics Award from ComicMonsters.com for "Best Scene of 2013" and was nominated for Best Mini-Series by The Ghastly Awards, a prestigious honor as nominees are chosen by horror comic book professionals. Additionally, Bloody Disgusting named Killogy in its Top 5 Best Mini-Series of 2013.

In July 2013, Robert teamed up with IDW again to produce his next comic series, The Shunned One, which focuses on an Angel of Death who goes rogue after being ordered to take several innocent lives. The release date for the comic series is listed as early 2015.

In May 2014, Robert announced he was teaming up with ex-Misfits guitarist, Doyle Wolfgang von Frankenstein, for a special Halloween 2014 Killogy issue which centers on a character based on Doyle.  Robert said that this was a continuation of the original Killogy series but that he did not expect any of the characters from the previous IDW published series to appear in this issue.  At the same time, Robert teamed with award-winning writer and producer Rodney Barnes to develop an animated television series based on the Killogy comic series.

Animated series 
Alan Robert's hit Killogy comic series (IDW Publishing) is currently being adapted into an animated television series by Robert's production company Wasted Talent Entertainment in association with Canadian-based Squeeze Studio Animation. Award-winning Executive Producer Rodney Barnes of The Boondocks fame is attached as Show-runner. A six-minute animated teaser featuring the likenesses and voices of celebrities Frank Vincent Marky Ramone, Brea Grant, and Doyle Wolfgang Von Frankenstein, who all appeared as characters in the original comic series, launched on Rolling Stone magazine's website.

Movies 
On July 19, 2013, it was announced that Robert had signed a movie deal with the Spanish film production company, Rodar Y Rodar, to produce a full-length feature film based on the Crawl To Me comic book series.  It was also announced that Robert would be co-producing the movie along with Jeff Mazzola and Chris White.  The director of the film will be Victor Garcia. While no release date was provided, it was said that studio work will be filmed in Spain and exteriors in Canada.

On July 9, 2014, Alan announced that his upcoming Shunned One comic was being adapted for a movie. The film adaption is being scripted by writer Jack Reher, and being co-produced by Robert's Wasted Talent Entertainment firm along with The Coalition Group.  At the time of the announcement, no scheduled release date for the movie had been listed.

Coloring books 
In May 2016, Robert continued his relationship with IDW Publishing when they jointly announced that IDW would be releasing Robert's The Beauty Of Horror: A GOREgeous Coloring Book on October 11, 2016. In an interview with Metal Insider, Robert got the inspiration for a horror/gore-themed coloring book while watching family members enjoying the recent resurgence of coloring books.

On May 11, 2017, Nerdist Industries announced, via their Twitter feed and website, the release of a promotional video for the second book in the series, The Beauty of Horror 2: Ghouliana's Creepatorium – Another GOREgeous Coloring Book. The book is scheduled to be released in the Fall of 2017 and is promised to continue to theme of the well-received first book.

References

External links 
 Alan Robert
 Spoiler NYC
 Wire Hangers
 Crawl To Me
 Killogy
 The Shunned One

Living people
Singers from New York City
Musicians from Brooklyn
American male singer-songwriters
Roadrunner Records artists
American comics writers
American comics artists
School of Visual Arts alumni
1971 births
Guitarists from New York City
American male bass guitarists
21st-century American singers
21st-century American bass guitarists
21st-century American male singers
Singer-songwriters from New York (state)